The 2017 British motorcycle Grand Prix was the twelfth round of the 2017 MotoGP season. It was held at the Silverstone Circuit in Silverstone on 27 August 2017.

Classification

MotoGP

 Jonas Folger crashed during a Sunday warm-up session and was declared unfit to start the race.

Moto2

Moto3
The race was red-flagged during the final lap (lap 17) after a collision between Juan Francisco Guevara and Bo Bendsneyder. The remaining riders actually finished the remainder of the lap, thus completing the original 17-lap race distance. However, the final result was based on the classification of the riders at the end of lap 16.

Championship standings after the race

MotoGP
Below are the standings for the top five riders and constructors after round twelve has concluded.

Riders' Championship standings

Constructors' Championship standings

 Note: Only the top five positions are included for both sets of standings.

Moto2

Moto3

Notes

References

British
Motorcycle Grand Prix
British motorcycle Grand Prix
British